The list of shipwrecks in April 1884 includes ships sunk, foundered, grounded, or otherwise lost during April 1884.

1 April

2 April

3 April

4 April

5 April

6 April

8 April

9 April

10 April

11 April

12 April

14 April

15 April

19 April

21 April

22 April

23 April

25 April

28 April

29 April

30 April

Unknown date

References

1884-04
Maritime incidents in April 1884